Pasha Beyg (also Romanized as Pāshā Beyg; also known as Pāshā Beyk) is a village in Almalu Rural District, Nazarkahrizi District, Hashtrud County, East Azerbaijan Province, Iran. At the 2006 census, its population was 347, in 64 families.

References 

Towns and villages in Hashtrud County